The name Eastern State Hospital can refer to psychiatric hospitals in a number of different locations:
Eastern State Hospital (Virginia): the first public facility in the United States constructed solely for the care and treatment of the mentally ill.
Eastern State Hospital (Washington)
Eastern State Hospital (Kentucky)
Eastern State Hospital (Oklahoma)